Akke Kumlien (1884–1949) was a Swedish calligrapher, typographer, graphic designer, type designer, artist etc.

He is the author of the book Bokstav och ande (The Letter and the Spirit) (Stockholm: Norstedt, 1948) and of Kunstneren og bokkunsten.

He is the subject of the book Akke Kumlien, book designer by Bror Zachrisson.

In 2004, an exhibit of his work took place at the Kungliga Biblioteket (Royal Library) in Stockholm.

Typefaces
In 1943 the Stempel Type Foundry released Kumlien.

References

Further reading
  Notes on printing and graphic arts, Volume 1. "Akke Kumlien: 1884-1949  by Bror Zachrisson
 "In the book shops, a book produced by Akke Kumlien is recognizable through the firm beauty of its and the attractive type arrangement of title page and ..."
 "The books, chosen as examples of book printing and typography, represent the work of thirty- designers, including the late Akke Kumlien and Bror Zachrisson. ..."
 Modern temperamålning: Kortfattad översikt av temperamåleriets material och teknik utarbetad by Akke Kumlien (Stockholm: Norstedt, 1934)

1884 births
1949 deaths
Swedish artists
Swedish typographers and type designers
Swedish graphic designers
Swedish designers
Swedish calligraphers